Sonet Records was a jazz, pop and rock record label operating as an imprint of Universal Music Sweden. It was founded in Sweden in 1956.

Sonet Records was established by Sven Lindholm and Gunnar Bergström, who managed the label into the 1980s. Dag Haeggqvist, the owner of Gazell Records, became an executive of the label in 1960, and Sonet eventually acquired Gazell's catalogue. It was distributed by Pickwick Records in North America in the 1960s, where it was involved in releasing some of Bill Haley's latter-day material. The label set up offices throughout Europe, including the United Kingdom. It also expanded into film, video, and other visual arts in addition to music. The label released both new material and reissues, many by Scandinavian artists in addition to albums by American jazz musicians as well as non-jazz material such as pop and rock music. It acquired the Danish label Storyville Records at some point.

Sonet Records was acquired by PolyGram in 1991.

Artists who have released material on Sonet Records

Jazz and blues artists

 Bernard Addison (listed on Sonet SLP 1001 Immortal Swing Sessions 1938-1943)
 Svend Asmussen
 Chet Baker
 Duck Baker
 The Balfa Brothers
 Chris Barber
 Count Basie
 Chu Berry (listed on Sonet SLP 1001 Immortal Swing Sessions 1938-1943)
 Rolf Billberg
 Ruby Braff
 Randy Brecker
 Bob Brookmeyer
 Roy Buchanan
 Burnin' Red Ivanhoe
 Gary Burton
 Benny Carter (listed on Sonet SLP 1001 Immortal Swing Sessions 1938-1943)
 Casiopea
 Al Casey (listed on Sonet SLP 1001 Immortal Swing Sessions 1938-1943)
 Sid Catlett (listed on Sonet SLP 1001 Immortal Swing Sessions 1938-1943)
 Don Cherry
 Richard Clayderman
 Vassar Clements
 Al Cohn
 Albert Collins
 Culpeper's Orchard
 Eddie "Lockjaw" Davis
 Wild Bill Davison
 Buddy DeFranco
 Vic Dickenson
 Manu Dibango
 Arne Domnerus
 Rockin' Dopsie
 Champion Jack Dupree
 Berndt Egerbladh
 Roy Eldridge (listed on Sonet SLP 1001 Immortal Swing Sessions 1938-1943)
 Dave Ellis
 Buddy Emmons
 Rolf Ericson
 John Fahey
 Maffy Falay
 Maynard Ferguson
 Svein Finnerud
 Curtis Fuller
 Funhouse
 Jan Garbarek
 Don Gardner
 Stan Getz
 Dizzy Gillespie
 Tiny Grimes
 Dexter Gordon
 Stefan Grossman
 Lars Gullin
 Rune Gustafsson
 Bengt Hallberg
 Lionel Hampton
 Nancy Harrow
 Clyde Hart (listed on Sonet SLP 1001 Immortal Swing Sessions 1938-1943)
 Coleman Hawkins (listed on Sonet SLP 1001 Immortal Swing Sessions 1938-1943)
 Earl Hines
 Bendik Hofseth
 Billie Holiday
 John Lee Hooker
 Hot Lips Page (listed on Sonet SLP 1001 Immortal Swing Sessions 1938-1943)
 Harry Jaeger (listed on Sonet SLP 1001 Immortal Swing Sessions 1938-1943)
 Jamie Kent
 Barney Kessel
 Earl King 
 The Kinsey Report
 John Kirby (listed on Sonet SLP 1001 Immortal Swing Sessions 1938-1943)
 Lee Konitz
 Leo Kottke
 Karin Krog
 Morten Gunnar Larsen
 Björn J:son Lindh
 Lonnie Mack
 Magnetic North Orchestra
 Adam Makowicz
 Jimmy Martin
 Sabu Martinez
 Brett Marvin and the Thunderbolts
 Al Morgan (listed on Sonet SLP 1001 Immortal Swing Sessions 1938-1943)
 Moving Fingers
 Marius Muller
 New York Contemporary Five
 New York Jazz Quartet
 Langsomt Mot Nord
 Fredrik Noren
 Niels-Henning Ørsted Pedersen
 
 Charlie Parker
 Bent Patey
 Ole Paus
 Bud Powell
 Professor Longhair
 Public Enemies
 Mike Richmond
 Mikael Rickfors
 Rockin' Jimmy & the Brothers of the Night
 Alrune Rod
 Red Rodney
 Bernt Rosengren
 Jimmy Rowles
 George Russell
 Sanne Salomonsen
 Joe Sample
 Archie Shepp
 Zoot Sims
 Sivuca
 Helen Sjoholm
 Peter Skellern
 Johnny Smith
 Spellbound
 Slam Stewart
 Sonny Stitt
 The Stukas
 Bo Sundblad
 Sun Ra
 Jamaaladeen Tacuma
 Sebastiao Tapajos
 Tasavallan Presidentti
 Buddy Tate
 KoKo Taylor
 Okay Temiz
 Joey Tempest
 Toots Thielemans
 Ed Thigpen
 Jukka Tolonen
 Radka Toneff
 Trio Toykeat
 Charles Tyler
 Michal Urbaniak
 Frank Valdor
 Billy Vaughn
 Joe Venuti
 Paolo Vinaccia
 Mads Vinding
 Cornelis Vreeswijk
 Sylvia Vrethammar
 Ulf Wakenius
 Bengt-Arne Wallin
 Kazumi Watanabe
 Bugge Wesseltoft
 Putte Wickman
 Big Joe Williams
 Teddy Wilson
 Gustav Winckler
 Kai Winding
 Lars Winnerback
 Johnny Winter
 Monica Zetterlund

Pop and rock artists
 Army of Lovers (1987-1988)
 Belfast Gypsies
 Black Lace
 Mari Boine
 Bobbysocks!
 Country Joe McDonald
 Fats Domino
 Aynsley Dunbar
 Ghost
 Bill Haley & His Comets
 Jethro Tull
 Komeda
 The Korgis
 Midnight Sun
 Freda Payne
 Rudy Pompilli and the Comets
 John Renbourn
 Secret Service
 Nina Simone
 Strawbs
 George Thorogood
 Pernilla Wahlgren
 Jennifer Warnes

References
Erik Kjellberg, "Sonet". The New Grove Dictionary of Jazz.

Swedish record labels
Jazz record labels
Pop record labels
Rock record labels
1956 establishments in Sweden
1991 disestablishments in Sweden